General elections were held in the U.S. state of Washington on November 3, 2020. A primary was held on August 4. This election cycle is notable as it was only the second in state history in which Democrats won the top three statewide elections by double digits. The first was the 1936 election, in the middle of the Great Depression. , this was the last time Republicans won any statewide election in Washington.

Federal

President of the United States 

Washington has 12 electoral votes for the presidential election, remaining unchanged from 2016. A presidential primary for both parties was held on March 10, 2020, with 13 candidates for the Democrats and one candidate for the Republicans. The 2020 Democratic primary was the first in the state's history to have a binding vote, replacing the caucus system that overrode the nonbinding primary vote.

United States House of Representatives 

All 10 of Washington's seats in the United States House of Representatives were up for re-election. All but one of the incumbents ran for re-election, the exception being Denny Heck (D) of the 10th district.

Statewide executive

Governor 

Incumbent Governor Jay Inslee (D) was re-elected to a third term in a landslide.

Lieutenant Governor 

Incumbent Lieutenant Governor Cyrus Habib (D) retired from politics. U.S. Representative Denny Heck won the open seat.

Attorney General 
Incumbent Attorney General Bob Ferguson (D) was re-elected to a third term.

Polling

Blanket primary

General election

Secretary of State 

Incumbent Secretary of State Kim Wyman (R) was re-elected to a third term. State Representative Gael Tarleton (D–Seattle) unsuccessfully challenged Wyman.

Public Lands Commissioner 

Incumbent Public Lands Commissioner Hilary Franz (D) was re-elected to a second term.

Polling

General election

State Auditor 

Incumbent State Auditor Pat McCarthy (D) was re-elected to a second term.

Polling

General election

State Treasurer 
Incumbent state treasurer Duane Davidson (R) ran for a second term. State Representative Mike Pellicciotti (D–Federal Way) defeated Davidson.

Polling

General election

Superintendent of Public Instruction 
Incumbent state superintendent Chris Reykdal (non-partisan election) was re-elected to a second term.

Polling

General election

Insurance Commissioner 
Incumbent insurance commissioner Mike Kreidler (D) was re-elected to a sixth term.

Polling

General election

Supreme Court 
Seats 3, 4, and 7 of the Washington Supreme Court were up for six-year terms. Debra L. Stephens, Charles W. Johnson, and Raquel Montoya-Lewis ran for new terms. Seat 6 Justice Charles Wiggins retired and Governor Inslee's appointee G. Helen Whitener ran for the final two years of the term.

Polling

Position 3

Position 6

Legislative

State Senate 

Twenty-five of the forty-nine seats in the Washington State Senate were up for election. Democrats kept a 28–21 majority in the Senate. Senators retiring this election were  Senators Randi Becker (R-Olympia), Maureen Walsh (R-Walla Walla), and Hans Zeiger (R-Puyallup). Senators Dean Takko (D) and Steve O'Ban (R) lost reelection.

State House of Representatives 

All 98 seats in the Washington House of Representatives were up for election. Democrats kept a 57–41 majority in the House. House members who didn't run for re-election were Representatives Sherry Appleton (D-Poulsbo), Richard DeBolt (R-Chehalis), Beth Doglio (D-Olympia), Chris Gildon (R-Puyallup), Bill Jenkin (R-Prosser), Christine Kilduff (D-University Place), Mike Pellicciotti (D-Federal Way), Eric Pettigrew (D-Seattle), Norma Smith (R-Clinton),  and Gael Tarleton (D-Seattle). Representatives Luanne Van Werven (R) and Brian Blake (D) lost reelection.

Ballot measures 
No initiatives to the people qualified for the ballot. One referendum was on the ballot, on Senate Bill 5395 regarding sexual education. One constitutional amendment was on the ballot, regarding the Family and Medical Leave Insurance Account and the Long-Term Care Services and Supports Trust Account. It passed with 58% in favor.

Ballot Initiatives

Polling 
Referendum 90

Notes

See also 

 Elections in Washington (state)

References

External links 
 Elections & Voting at the Washington Secretary of State
 Washington at Ballotpedia
 
 
  (State affiliate of the U.S. League of Women Voters)
 

 
Washington